Michael Marcour (born 1959) is a German competitive sailor and Olympic medalist. He won a silver medal in the Star class at the 1984 Summer Olympics in Los Angeles, together with Joachim Griese.

References

1959 births
Living people
German male sailors (sport)
Sailors at the 1984 Summer Olympics – Star
Olympic sailors of Germany
Olympic silver medalists for West Germany
Olympic medalists in sailing
Medalists at the 1984 Summer Olympics